Choko may refer to:
An alternative name for Chayote, a green vegetable of the gourd family 
Chokó languages, an alternative name for the Choco languages
Chöko, a Tibeto-Burman language
Choko (cup), a type of sake cup
Choko (game)
The name of a fictional character in Chokotto Sister
Isabelle Choko (born 1928), French concentration camp survivor and chess master

See also
Choco (disambiguation)